A list of books and essays by or about Sergei Eisenstein:

Eisenstein, Sergei